Ryszard Fudali (born 16 August 1971) is a retired Polish football defender.

References

1971 births
Living people
Polish footballers
Hutnik Nowa Huta players
Śląsk Wrocław players
MKS Cracovia (football) players
Stal Stalowa Wola players
Proszowianka Proszowice players
Association football defenders